Carl Gabriel Yorke (born November 23, 1952) is an American actor.

He was one of four actors who the Italian police believed had been murdered in the making of the 1980 horror film, Cannibal Holocaust.  On September 21st 2020 he appeared on the Uneasy Terrain Explorers podcast discussing his experience and the following legacy of Cannibal Holocaust.

Filmography

Movies 
Cannibal Holocaust (1980) - Alan Yates
Jack the Bear (1993) - Gordon Layton
Ghost in the Machine (1993) - Safety Technician
Apollo 13 (1995) - SIM Tech #2
Idle Hands (1999) - Chaperone

Television 
All My Children (1980-1982)
The Paper Chase (1982–1983) - Berger
Dynasty (1984) - Reporter
Civil Wars (1992) - Alexander Eiger
NYPD Blue (1993) - Detective Sherman
Viper (1994) - Reporter
Sirens (1994)
My So-Called Life (1994) - Investor
Letter to My Killer (1995, TV Movie) - Hunter #2
Sliders (1998-1999) - Technician / Director / Kromagg Leader (final appearance)

Stage 
 The Committee Workshop (1969-1972) (San Francisco improvisation company)
 Improvisation, Inc. (1972-1974) (San Francisco improvisation company)
 One Flew Over the Cuckoo's Nest by Dale Wasserman (as Ruckly) (Resident company in San Francisco 1974–1975) (3 national tours 1975–1976)
 Visions of Kerouac by Martin Duberman (as Gary Snyder) (1977) (Lion Theater, NYC)
 Badgers by Donald Wollner (as Doug) (1981) (Manhattan Punchline)

See also
Perry Pirkanen
Francesca Ciardi
Luca Barbareschi
Robert Kerman

References

External links

American male film actors
Living people
1952 births